Stop Thief! is an extant 1920 silent romantic comedy film directed by Harry Beaumont and starring Tom Moore and Irene Rich. It was produced and distributed by the Goldwyn Pictures company.

Cast
Tom Moore - Jack Dougan
Hazel Daly - Snatcher Nell
Irene Rich - Madge Carr
Kate Lester - Mrs. Carr
Molly Malone - Joan Carr
Edward McWade - Mr. Carr
Raymond Hatton -James Cluney
Harris Gordon - Dr. Willoughby
Henry Ralston - Reverend Spelvin
John Lince - Detective Thompson
Maurice Flynn - Police Sergeant

uncredited
Otto Hoffman -
James Neill -
Andre Robson -

Preservation status
A print of the film is preserved at the George Eastman House.

References

External links

 Stop Thief! at IMDb.com

1920 films
American silent feature films
American black-and-white films
American films based on plays
Films directed by Harry Beaumont
Goldwyn Pictures films
American romantic comedy films
1920 romantic comedy films
1920s American films
Silent romantic comedy films
Silent American comedy films